The  was a public hall in Chikusa-ku, Nagoya, Aichi Prefecture, Japan. The hall opened in 1980, and had a seating capacity of 1,666 people. It closed in 2008, and has since been demolished.

See also
 Kōsei Nenkin Kaikan, public halls in Japan formerly supported by welfare pension funds

References

Concert halls in Japan
Buildings and structures in Nagoya
1980 establishments in Japan
Buildings and structures completed in 1980